The 2016–17 Brisbane Roar FC season was the club's twelfth season participating in the A-League, the FFA Cup for the third time, as well as the AFC Champions League for the fourth time.

Players

Squad information
Correct as of 30 September 2016 – players' numbers as per the official Brisbane Roar website

From youth squad

Transfers in

Transfers out

Contract extensions

Technical staff

Statistics

Squad statistics

|-
|colspan="24"|Players no longer at the club:

Pre-season and friendlies

Competitions

Overall

A-League

League table

Results summary

Results by round

Matches

Finals series

FFA Cup

AFC Champions League

Qualifying play-offs

Group stage

References

Notes

External links
 Official Website

Brisbane Roar
Brisbane Roar FC seasons